Sursky (masculine), Surskaya (feminine), or Surskoye (neuter) may refer to:
Sursky District, a district of Ulyanovsk Oblast, Russia
Surskoye, an urban locality (a work settlement) in Sursky District of Ulyanovsk Oblast, Russia